The 2022 Polish Speedway season was the 2022 season of speedway in Poland.

Individual

Polish Individual Speedway Championship
The 2022 Individual Speedway Polish Championship was the 2022 version of Polish Individual Speedway Championship organised by the Polish Motor Union (PZM). The Championship was won by the world champion Bartosz Zmarzlik. He became the first rider to successfully defend the title since Tomasz Gollob in 2002.

The final was held over three legs at Grudziadz, Krosno and Rzeszów.

Golden Helmet
The 2022 Golden Golden Helmet organised by the Polish Motor Union (PZM) was the 2022 event for the league's leading riders. The final was held at Opole on the 18 April. Bartosz Zmarzlik won the Golden Helmet for the third successive year.

Polish U21 Championship
 winner Mateusz Świdnicki

Silver Helmet
 winner - Jakub Miśkowiak

Bronze Helmet
 winner - Jakub Krawczyk

Pairs

Polish Pairs Speedway Championship
The 2022 Polish Pairs Speedway Championship was the 2022 edition of the Polish Pairs Speedway Championship. The final was held on 3 April at Poznań.

Team

Team Speedway Polish Championship
The 2022 Team Speedway Polish Championship was the 2022 edition of the Team Polish Championship. Lublin won the Ekstraliga and were awarded the gold medal and declared Polish Team Champions. Teams finishing second and third were awarded silver and bronze medals respectively.

Krosno won the 1. Liga and were promoted to the Ekstraliga and Poznań  won the 2. Liga.

The German team Wölfe Wittstock were replaced by Polonia Piła in Liga 2.

Ekstraliga
Clubs

Quarter-finals

Semi-finals

Third place

Final

1. Liga
Clubs

Quarter-finals

Semi-finals

Final

2. Liga
Clubs

Semi-finals

Final

References

Speedway leagues
Professional sports leagues in Poland
Polish
speedway